The Blackstone Legal Fellowship is an American legal training and summer internship program for Christian law students, developed and facilitated by the Evangelical Christian legal group Alliance Defending Freedom (ADF). About 1,900 law students have participated in the program.  Its main campus is in Scottsdale, Arizona. Among its faculty are Missouri U.S. Senator Josh Hawley and U.S. Supreme Court Associate Justice Amy Coney Barrett. ADF co-founder and president Alan Sears said that the program's goal was to put Christian lawyers into "positions of influence, thereby impacting the legal culture and keeping the door open for the Gospel." The program has attracted criticism, given the ADF's designation by the Southern Poverty Law Center as a hate group.

Overview

Blackstone Legal Fellowship was founded in 2000 with a class of 24 interns. In 2012, when Sears was asked about the major achievements of ADF, he said "among the things I am most thankful for are our Blackstone Legal Fellowship graduates."  The program is named for Sir William Blackstone, the eighteenth century English legal scholar and jurist whose commentaries on the common law had, according to some legal scholars, a profound impact on the founders of the United States.  Blackstone training program promotes the doctrine of "natural law."

ADF, which runs the Blackstone program, requires its employees to profess "adherence to the inspired, infallible, inerrant, and authoritative Word of God in Scripture." Its mission is to "keep the door open for the gospel" by seeking to bring United States law in line with their Christian beliefs.  The organization seeks to spread a belief in "the framers' original intent for the US Constitution and the Bill of Rights as it reflects God's natural law and God's higher law."

Training
The Blackstone Fellowship consists of three phases. Students spend two weeks in classes on ethics, theology and jurisprudence. They are then assigned to a six-week "field placement" in the United States or abroad, with placements at "public-interest law firms, attorneys, law professors, think tanks, and public-policy organizations." Placements are based on students' aptitude and career goals. Finally, the students return to ADF headquarters in Scottsdale for a week of presentations focusing on career development and professional networking, and given an orientation to the Blackstone alumni network. Students attending the training program receive a $6,300 scholarship for participating, and some receive additional money for expenses during their field placements.

Coney Barrett controversy
In 2017, President Donald Trump's nominee to the United States Court of Appeals for the Seventh Circuit, Amy Coney Barrett, was criticized by Senator Al Franken for teaching constitutional law at Blackstone. In her Senate committee hearing he referred to ADF as a "hate group." Barrett responded that the hate group label is "controversial." Barrett was confirmed to the court by the Senate.

People
The following is a list of notable people who affiliated with Blackstone.
 Amy Coney Barrett, taught constitutional law at Blackstone. Currently associate justice on the United States Supreme Court.
 J. Budziszewski, professor, member of Advisory Board of Blackstone
 Robert P. George, legal scholar, member of Blackstone Advisory Board
 Mary Ann Glendon, former U. S. Ambassador to the Holy See, current member of Blackstone Advisory Board  
 Edwin Meese, former Attorney General of the United States, currently member of Blackstone Advisory Board
 Charles E. Rice, former legal scholar and member of Blackstone Advisory Board
 Andrew Sandlin, Christian minister and theologian, faculty member at Blackstone

References

Further reading

External links
 

Christian nationalism
Internship programs
Scholarships in the United States
Legal education
Alliance Defending Freedom
Education in Scottsdale, Arizona
Conservative organizations in the United States